Kyzyl-Suu (formerly known as Pokrovka) is a village in the Issyk-Kul Region of Kyrgyzstan. About 10km inland from Lake Issyk Kul on the A363 highway between Jeti-Ögüz resort and Barskoon, it is the capital of Jeti-Ögüz District. Its population was 15,075 in 2021.

At the head of the Chong Kyzyl-Suu ('little red water') valley, it is a base for trekking into the 14,000 foot mountains to the south.

Etymology
Kyzyl-Suu is named for the "Kyzyl-Suu" river that runs through it. Kyzyl-Suu literally translates to "red water", in reference to the red clay which stains the water during periods of heavy rain. The name is similar to that of the Kizilsu Kyrgyz Autonomous Prefecture, Xinjiang, China.

Population

References

Populated places in Issyk-Kul Region